Hatim Ammor (born August 29, 1981) is a Moroccan singer. He performed at the Expo 2020. Ammor was born in 1981 in Hay Mohammadi. His wife, Hind Tazi, was diagnosed with cancer on 2019. Ammor is a brand ambassador of Oppo.

References

External links

 

Moroccan actors
Moroccan male actors
Moroccan male film actors
Moroccan male television actors
Living people
1981 births
21st-century Moroccan male singers
Musicians from Casablanca